Coscinocera is a genus of large moths from the family Saturniidae, that are found in Australasia. The genus was erected by Arthur Gardiner Butler in 1879.

The genus contains Coscinocera hercules, the largest moth in Australia, and the insect with the largest wing surface area.

Species
Coscinocera amputata Niepelt, 1936
Coscinocera anteus Bouvier, 1927
Coscinocera brachyura Biedermann, 1932
Coscinocera butleri Rothschild, 1895
Coscinocera eurytheus Rothschild, 1898
Coscinocera heraclides Joicey & Talbot, 1916
Coscinocera hercules (Miskin, 1876)
Coscinocera heros Rothschild, 1899
Coscinocera joiceyi Bouvier, 1927
Coscinocera omphale Butler, 1879
Coscinocera rothschildi Le Moult, 1933
Coscinocera titanus Niepelt, 1916

References

Encyclopedia of Life

Saturniidae